Herrera is a province in Panama. Named after General Tomás Herrera, the province was founded on January 18, 1915 from a division of the Los Santos province.  The capital city of Herrera is Chitré, which is located near the province's coastline.  Herrera is bordered on the north by the provinces of Veraguas and Coclé, on the south by the province of Los Santos, on the east by Golfo de Parita and the province of Los Santos, and on the west by the province of Veraguas.

History
After gaining independence from Spain in 1821, the isthmus of Panama was divided into two provinces, Panamá and Veraguas.  The province Panamá consisted of the districts of Natá, Portobelo, Panama and Darién. At the time, the location now occupied by the city of Chitré was inhabited by a small population of indigenous persons, near La Villa de Los Santos and was governed from Natá. It later came under the control of the Los Santos government. The province of Herrera was created in 1854 and eliminated in 1860. 55 years later, in 1915 the province was created again by the president of Panama Dr. Belisario Porras.

Chitré was founded on October 19, 1848 by Ventura Solís, Matías Rodríguez, José Ríos, José María Benavidez, Ildelfonso Pérez, Blas Tello, Eugenio Barrera, José Burgos y Carlos Rodríguez. Chitré, however, was included in the province of Los Santos. It was not until 1915 under the Porras administration that Chitré became a part of Herrera and was made the province's capital.

Economy
Of Panama's nine provinces, Herrera ranks third in sugarcane production.  Other commercial mainstays in Herrera include retail, equipment repair, banking, and domestic service.  Prominent industries include dairy, cattle, commercial fishing, alcohol, ceramics, clay products, mosaics, and cement.

Culture
The famous Festival del Manito Ocueño has its origin in the city of Ocú in Herrera.  Also, the pottery work in the province is extensive, consisting mainly of high-quality reproductions of pre-Columbian artifacts.  Herrera's pottery is the best-known in the country.  Panama's most famous alcoholic drink, "seco" (translation: dry), is produced in Herrera, which is a sugarcane liqueur said to be drier than normal rum. Varela Hermanos, a company based in Pesé, sells seco under the trade name Seco Herrerano.

Sports
Herrera's baseball team has won sixteen national championships, more than any other team in the country, including the 2005, 2006 and 2007 titles.

Carnival
The best-known carnivals are celebrated in Chitré, Parita and Ocú.  Chitré's carnival is one of the most popular in Panama, but those in Ocú have risen in prominence in recent years.

Administrative divisions
Herrera Province is divided into 7 distritos (districts) and subdivided into 49 corregimientos.

References

 
Provinces of Panama
States and territories established in 1915
1915 establishments in Panama